Cutaneous lupus mucinosis (also known as "Papular and nodular mucinosis in lupus erythematosus," "Papular and nodular mucinosis of Gold," and "Papulonodular mucinosis in lupus erythematosus") is a cutaneous condition characterized by lesions that present as asymptomatic skin-colored, at times reddish, 0.5–2 cm papules and nodules.

See also 
 Papular mucinosis
 List of cutaneous conditions

References 

Mucinoses